Roybridge (Scottish Gaelic: Drochaid Ruaidh, "the bridge over the Roy") is a small village, that lies at the confluence of the rivers River Roy and River Spean, located  east of Spean Bridge, in  Kilmonivaig Parish, Inverness-shire, Scottish Highlands and is in the Highland administrative area.

Roybridge is on the A86 between Spean Bridge and Newtonmore, and has a station on the (former West Highland Railway) line, served by trains passing between Crianlarich and Fort William.

Mary MacKillop

Both of the parents of Australia's only recognised saint Mary MacKillop, lived in Roybridge, prior to emigrating to Australia. MacKillop visited Roybridge in the 1870s, and St Margaret's, the local parish church of the Roman Catholic Diocese of Argyll and the Isles, now has a shrine to her.

Other notable people
Peter Hope, 4th Baron Rankeillour (1935–2005), landowner and peer, lived at Achaderry House.

Joseph Toal, current bishop of Diocese of Motherwell.

References

External links 

Populated places in Lochaber